Ambikapathy may refer to:

 Ambikapathy (1937 film), a 1937 Tamil film directed by Ellis R. Dungan
 Ambikapathy (1957 film), a 1957 Tamil film directed by P. Neelakantan
 Ambikapathy (2013 film), a 2013 Tamil film directed by Anand L. Rai